Michela Figini (born 7 April 1966) is a former World Cup alpine ski racer from Switzerland. She is an Olympic, World Cup and world champion.

Career
Figini made her World Cup debut at age 16 in January 1983 and won the downhill at the 1984 Winter Olympics in Sarajevo at age 17. Through 2014, she remains the youngest Olympic champion in alpine skiing. She won the downhill the following year at the 1985 World Championships. She also came  second in the Downhill at the 1987 World Championships, and won a silver medal in the Super-G at the 1988 Winter Olympics in Calgary.

Figini won 26 World Cup races and overall titles in 1985 and 1988, as well as four season titles in downhill, one in Super-G.

Personal
Figini retired in 1990 and later worked as a television commentator. She has two children from her first marriage with the former Italian alpine ski racer Ivano Camozzi.

World Cup results

Season titles
7 titles: (2 overall, 4 DH, 1 SG)

Season standings

Race victories
26 wins – (17 DH, 3 SG, 2 GS, 4 K)

World Championship results

Olympic results

See also
List of FIS Alpine Ski World Cup women's race winners

References

External links
 
 

1966 births
Living people
People from Prato
Swiss female alpine skiers
Alpine skiers at the 1984 Winter Olympics
Alpine skiers at the 1988 Winter Olympics
Olympic alpine skiers of Switzerland
Olympic gold medalists for Switzerland
Olympic silver medalists for Switzerland
Olympic medalists in alpine skiing
FIS Alpine Ski World Cup champions
Medalists at the 1984 Winter Olympics
Medalists at the 1988 Winter Olympics
Sportspeople from Ticino
Sportspeople from the Province of Prato